Cancellata is a suborder of bryozoans in the order Cyclostomatida.

Families 
The following families are accepted:
Calvetiidae Borg, 1944 (1+ Genera, 2+ Species)
 Canaliporidae Brood, 1972 (1+ Genera, 4+ Species)
 Crassodiscoporidae Brood, 1972 (1+ Genera, 1+ Species)
Crisinidae d'Orbigny, 1853 (15+ Genera, 18+ Species)
 Ctyididae d'Orbigny, 1854 (27+ Genera, 28+ Species)
Horneridae Smitt, 1867 (5+ Genera, 8+ Species)
Petaloporidae Gregory, 1899 (13+ Genera, 13+ Species)
 Pseudidmoneidae Borg, 1944 (1+ Genera, 1+ Species)
 Stigmatoechidae Brood, 1972 (1+ Genera, 5+ Species)
The following were formerly included

Radioporidae is now accepted as Lichenoporidae Smitt, 1867
Stegohorneridae Borg, 1944 is now accepted as Stigmatoechidae Brood, 1972

See also 
 List of Cyclostomatida families

References

External links 
 

 

Cyclostomatida
Protostome suborders